Hugh Hodgson Gillett (19 June 1836 – 22 January 1915) was an English first-class cricketer and clergyman.

The son of Gabriel Edward Gillett, he was born in June 1836 at Waltham on the Wolds, Leicestershire. He was educated at Winchester College, before going up to Exeter College, Oxford in 1854. While studying at Oxford, he played first-class cricket for Oxford University, making his debut against the Marylebone Cricket Club (MCC) at Oxford in 1857. He played first-class cricket for Oxford until 1858, making a total of four appearances. Gillett took 16 wickets with his right-arm roundarm medium pace bowling, at an average of 11.93. He took two five wicket hauls, with best figures of 6 for 22.

After graduating from Oxford, Gillett took holy orders in the Church of England in 1873. His first ecclesiastical post was as curate of Wantage from 1859–62, before becoming curate at Finedon, Northamptonshire from 1862–65. He took on the curacy of Compton, Guildford in 1865, before becoming the curate at his place of birth from 1867–71. Gillett returned to first-class cricket in 1868, making two appearances for the MCC against Oxford University and Cambridge University at Lord's, making a half century against Cambridge. He became curate at Wadenhoe, Northamptonshire from 1871–77, before returning to Compton to become rector there in 1877. Gillett died in January 1915 at Thornbury, Gloucestershire. His son, Charles, also played first-class cricket.

References

External links

1836 births
1915 deaths
People from the Borough of Melton
Cricketers from Leicestershire
People educated at Winchester College
Alumni of Exeter College, Oxford
English cricketers
Oxford University cricketers
19th-century English Anglican priests
Marylebone Cricket Club cricketers
20th-century English Anglican priests